Ariel Bension (also transliterated as Ben-Zion, born May 7, 1880, in Jerusalem, Ottoman Empire; died November 9, 1932, in Neuilly-sur-Seine, French Third Republic) was a Jewish writer.

Life 
Ariel Bension was the "son of a grand chacham of a Moroccan Kabbalist sect" and a descendant of Abraham ben Samuel ibn Hasdai ha-Levi of Barcelona.

As a young man, Bension spent some time with relatives in French North Africa and then went to Germany and Switzerland to study philosophy. He received his doctorate from the University of Bern.

Bension was a rabbi in Bitola for a year in 1913, which had belonged to the Kingdom of Serbia since 1912. Back in Palestine, he married Rahel Mizrahi and later, had a second marriage to Ida Siegler from Montreal. His estate therefore went to his Canadian relatives and from them to the University of Alberta.

Bension was active in Zionism and traveled to Jewish communities in the Near East and Asia, North Africa, South America and Europe, where he campaigned for support for the Yishuv of Palestine. He took part in the eleventh World Zionist Congress in Vienna and the fifteenth World Zionist Congress in Basel.

Because of his historical work on the Zohar, he was appointed (corresponding) member of the Real Academia de la Historia in Madrid.

Works
 The Marriage of Death. Translation Eugen Hoeflich and others. Sascha Kronburg drew the 6 pictures and the cover. Tal, Leipzig 1920.
 The Jewish Renaissance in Eretz Israel, in 
 
 
 
 Jack Sasson Levy: "Un diamante en el camino. Vida y obra del Dr. Ariel Ben Zion", Tronix Diseño, Sonora [Mexico] 2006.

References

External links 
 
 

1880 births
1932 deaths
Jewish writers
University of Bern alumni
Corresponding members of the Real Academia de la Historia